Garry Kasparov (born 1963) most often refers to Russian former World Chess Champion.

Kasparov may also refer to:

People 
Andrey Kasparov (born 1966), Armenian-American pianist, composer and professor
Gevorg Kasparov (born 1980), Armenian football goalkeeper
Yuri Kasparov (born 1955), Russian composer

Branded products 
Kasparov's Gambit, a 1993 chess video game by Electronic Arts
Virtual Kasparov, a chess video game

See also 
Gasparov, a similar Russian surname

Russian-language surnames
Surnames from given names